Arachnis citra is a moth of the family Erebidae. It was described by Berthold Neumögen and Harrison Gray Dyar Jr. in 1893. It is found in North America, including Arizona, California, Colorado and Utah.

Taxonomy
Arachnis citra was formerly listed as a subspecies Arachnis picta.

Subspecies
Arachnis citra citra
Arachnis citra verna Barnes & McDunnough, 1918

References

Moths described in 1893
Spilosomina
Moths of North America